Patan Multiple Campus (PMC) is a campus under Tribhuvan University. The campus is situated at Patan Dhoka, Lalitpur of Nepal. It was founded formally as "Patan Inter College" on 17th Bhadra, 2011 BS which was inaugurated by the then crown prince His Majesty Mahendra Bir Bikram Shah on Bhadra 31, 2021 BS. After the implementation of national education system, it was renamed as Patan Multiple Campus on Shravan 01, 2030 BS.

References

 

Universities and colleges in Nepal
Tribhuvan University
1954 establishments in Nepal